Garouste is a surname. Notable people with the surname include:

 Élisabeth Garouste (born 1946), French interior designer
 Gérard Garouste (born 1946), French contemporary artist, husband of Élisabeth

See also
 Garoute

French-language surnames